Broadway is a 1942 crime drama musical film directed by William A. Seiter and starring George Raft as himself and Pat O'Brien as a detective. The supporting cast features Janet Blair and Broderick Crawford.

Another fictionalized biographical movie based on Raft's life, The George Raft Story (1961), featured a different actor (Ray Danton) playing Raft.

Plot
George Raft, a Hollywood dancer, returns to Manhattan and recalls working in a nightclub with a bootlegger's girlfriend.

Cast
 George Raft as George Raft
 Pat O'Brien as Dan McCorn
 Janet Blair as Billie Moore
 Broderick Crawford as Steve Crandall
 Marjorie Rambeau as Lillian (Lil) Rice
 Anne Gwynne as Pearl
 S. Z. Sakall as Nick
 Edward Brophy as Porky (as Edward S. Brophy)
 Marie Wilson as Grace
 Gus Schilling as Joe
 Ralf Harolde as Dolph
 Arthur Shields as Pete Dailey
 Iris Adrian as Maisie
 Janet Warren as Ruby (as Elaine Morey)
 Dorothy Moore as Ann
 Nestor Paiva as Rinalti
 Abner Biberman as Trado
 Damian O'Flynn as Scar Edwards
 Mack Gray as Mack 'Killer' Gray

Production
Universal paid $175,000 for the rights to the 1926 play of the same name that had previously been filmed in 1929. On Broadway, Lee Tracy played the dancer, Thomas Jackson played the detective and Paul Porcasi played the nightclub owner. In the 1929 film, Jackson and Porcasi reprised their roles and Glenn Tryon replaced Tracy. Pat O'Brien once played the detective role in a road show.

In February 1941, Universal announced the film for the coming year. Bruce Manning, a writer who had recently been promoted to producer, would produce and George Raft and Broderick Crawford would star. Manning and Felix Young were to write the screenplay.

However, Raft was under contract for three more pictures with Warner Bros., which refused to loan him to Universal. Raft had been refusing roles that he did not like over the course of eight months, but an agreement was reached whereby $27,500 would be taken from Raft's salary to allow Warner Bros. to borrow Robert Cummings from Universal. In December 1941, Raft signed on to make the film.

Manning wanted to change the bootlegger characters from the play into foreign agents. He discussed the story with Raft and recognized the similarities between the story of Roy, the dancer played on stage by Tracy, and that of Raft's early career. He kept the characters as bootleggers but changed the story to focus on Raft. He also added a prologue and epilogue in which Raft returns to New York after establishing himself as a movie star.

In February 1942, O'Brien signed on and filming began.

Reception
The film was a success with audiences.

The Los Angeles Times called Broadway a "sock melodrama." Filmink said that the film "... isn’t particularly well remembered but it's a lot of fun, with plenty of gunfire and dancing, and was reasonably popular – Raft was best known for his gangster movies, but he was also a half-decent draw in musicals."

References

External links

Review of film at Variety

1940s musical drama films
1942 films
American black-and-white films
American mystery drama films
1940s English-language films
Films about actors
Films about musical theatre
Films about theatre
American films based on plays
Films directed by William A. Seiter
Films set in New York City
Universal Pictures films
Films scored by Frank Skinner
American musical drama films
American crime drama films
1942 crime drama films
1940s mystery drama films
1940s American films